Salem is a compact rural community and unincorporated place in the incorporated township of Centre Wellington, Wellington County, in southwestern Ontario, Canada.

Economy
Local business area in Salem is mainly found along and near Woolwich Street (County Road) and County Road 7 including:

 Esso gas station with convenience store
 Ontario Potato Board office
 Strata Gallery
 Mirage Limousine 
 Salem Collision
 Deboer's Farm Equipment
 Burns Motorsports
 Artech Millwright
 Shantz Automotive

Transportation

Salem has two bridges that over Irvine Creek:

 Pratt truss bridge carrying Woolwich Street West: paved single lane in each direction with single sided sidewalk for pedestrians on northside
 Concrete beam bridge carried unpaved Washington Street: requiring traffic to yield as bridge too narrow to carry two way traffic has been closed

Wellington County Road 7 and Wellington County Road 10 (Woolwich Street West and Geddes Street) are then main primary roads connecting Salem with other communities. Most of the roads in Salem are gravel other than the two aforementioned county roads. Within Salem there is one traffic light at Woolwich and Wellington County Road 7 with all other intersections controlled by stop signs.

Education

Salem Public School is the only school situated in Salem and belongs to the Upper Grand District School Board. Secondary students needs to travel to Fergus, Ontario to attend Centre Wellington District High School.

The old Salem School House at 93 Woolwich Street West (Woolwich Street and Wellington County Road 7) is now home to Strata Gallery.

The nearest Catholic school (within the Wellington Catholic District School Board) is St. Mary's Catholic School in Elora Ontario. The closest Catholic high school is found in Guelph, Ontario.

Recreation

Recreation facilities located within Salem are Centre Wellington Ball Hockey Club and Veteran's Park.

Neighbourhoods

Most residents live along the areas along Irvine Creek and is known for its many historic stone houses. In recent years, Salem's size has grown due to an urban development on William Street, between Water Street and Victoria Street.

Places of worship

 Grand River Community Church - Evangelical Baptist
 Canadian Reformed Church of Elora

References

Communities in Centre Wellington